These are the full results of the athletics competition at the 2001 Mediterranean Games taking place between September 11–14, 2001 in Radès, Tunisia.

Men's results

100 meters

Heats – September 11Wind:Heat 1: +2.4 m/s, Heat 2: +2.0 m/s, Heat 3: +3.5 m/s

Final – September 11

Wind: +2.5 m/s

200 meters

Heats – September 13Wind:Heat 1: -1.5, Heat 2: +2.0 m/s, Heat 3: 0.0 m/s

Final – September 13Wind:+1.4 m/s

400 meters

Heats – September 12

Final – September 12

800 meters

Heats – September 11

Final – September 12

1500 meters
September 14

5000 meters
September 11

10,000 meters
September 14

Marathon
September 11

110 meters hurdles

Heats – September 12Wind:Heat 1: +2.2 m/s, Heat 2: +4.5 m/s

Final – September 12Wind:0.0 m/s

400 meters hurdles

Heats – September 11

Final – September 11

3000 meters steeplechase
September 12

4 × 100 meters relay
September 13

4 × 400 meters relay
September 14

20 kilometers walk
September 12

High jump
September 13

Pole vault
September 14

Long jump
Qualification – September 12

Final – September 12

Triple jump
September 11

Shot put
September 13

Discus throw
September 12

Hammer throw
September 14

Javelin throw
September 14

Decathlon
September 11–12

Women's results

100 meters

Heats – September 11Wind:Heat 1: +3.1, Heat 2: +2.6, Heat 3: +2.9

Final – September 11

Wind: +1.6 m/s

200 meters

Heats – September 13Wind:Heat ?: +0.4 m/s, Heat 3: +1.3

Final – September 13

Wind: +2.6 m/s

400 meters

Heats – September 12

Final – September 12

800 meters

Heats – September 11

Final – September 12

1500 meters
September 14

5000 meters
September 13

10,000 meters
September 12

Marathon
September 11

100 meters hurdles

Heats – September 12Wind:Heat 1: +2.4 m/s, Heat 2: +0.9 m/s

Final – September 12

Wind: +1.5 m/s

400 meters hurdles

Heats – September 11

Final – September 11

3000 meters steeplechase
September 11

4 × 100 meters relay
September 13

4 × 400 meters relay
September 14

20 kilometers walk
September 14

High jump
September 12

Pole vault
September 11

Long jump
September 13

Triple jump
September 14

Shot put
September 12

Discus throw
September 11

Hammer throw
September 13

Javelin throw
September 13

Heptathlon
September 13–14

References

Finals results

Mediterranean Games
2001